The Scene Aesthetic is the second album released by The Scene Aesthetic and is a re-release of their 2006 debut album, Building Homes from What We've Known. The album contains remastered and remixed versions of all of the tracks from their debut album plus three additional tracks.

The Scene Aesthetic was released on July 10, 2007.

Track listing

Personnel
The Scene Aesthetic
Andrew de Torres – guitar, vocals, harmonica, mandolin
Eric Bowley – vocals, tambourine

Additional musicians
Xavier McHugh – drums
Nick Simmons – bass
Robbie Cochrane (of Danger Radio) – guitar
Brandon Metcalf – programming, percussion
Spencer Mertel (of Danger Radio) – programming
Nico Hartikainen (of Danger Radio) – programming
Dan Young (of This Providence) – vocals on "We've Got the Rain on Our Side"

References

2006 albums
The Scene Aesthetic albums